Stemmatodus is an extinct genus of prehistoric ray-finned fish that lived in Europe during the Early Cretaceous approximately 129 to 125 million years ago.

See also

 List of prehistoric bony fish
 Prehistoric fish

References

Early Cretaceous fish
Pycnodontiformes genera
Early Cretaceous fish of North America